José Guillermo del Solar Alvarez-Calderón (born 28 November 1967) is a Peruvian football manager and former player who played as a defensive midfielder.

During his playing career, spent in four countries – mainly in Spain, where he amassed La Liga totals of 149 matches and ten goals during six seasons – he was nicknamed Chemo. He started and finished it at Universitario.

Del Solar as a Peruvian international for 15 years. He started working as a manager in 2005, also being in charge of the national team late into the decade.

Playing career

Club
Born in Lima, Del Solar developed at the youth system of Universitario de Deportes, but played his first professional match with Asociación Deportiva San Agustín after he was loaned by Universitario to continue his development as a player. He won his first Peruvian Primera División championship with San Agustín, defeating Alianza Lima in December 1986.

Del Solar's last official appearance was a 0–0 draw against traditional rivals Alianza Lima for the Apertura on 7 July 2002, playing for his first club which won 1–0 in the first game, with 0–0 in Trujillo.

Del Solar competed in Spain from 1992 to 1998, always in La Liga. He started at CD Tenerife – where he partnered Argentine Fernando Redondo in central midfield, and also his compatriot Percy Olivares – helping the Canary Islands side rob Real Madrid of the league title in the last round in his first season, playing in 30 matches and scoring once (the team also qualified for the first time ever to the UEFA Cup); this dramatic league scenario also happened in the following year, but his presence was much more testimonial.

In 1996, after suffering relegation with UD Salamanca, del Solar was a starter at RC Celta de Vigo but appeared rarely for Valencia CF, after which he left the country, resuming his career in Turkey and Belgium (one season apiece, interspersed with spells in his country) and finally retiring at his very first club at the age of 34.

International
Del Solar earned 74 caps for Peru, in which he scored nine goals. He made his debut on 28 January 1986 against China (1–3), playing his last international match on 8 November 2001 against Argentina (0–2), 20 days before his 34th birthday.

Del Solar was selected to six Copa América tournaments, netting three times in four matches – twice through penalties – as the national team reached the quarter-finals in the 1993 edition, in Ecuador.

Coaching career
Del Solar began working as a coach with Villarreal CF's reserves in Tercera División, in 2003, but left in December to acquire his coaching license. He returned to the side in June 2004, but resigned on 4 October.

In 2005, del Solar worked at Club Atlético Colón, aided by former Tenerife teammate Juan Antonio Pizzi as the pair was sacked after only three matches and as many losses. He was named manager of Sporting Cristal afterwards, leading the team to the domestic league in 2005.

In 2007, del Solar was appointed at former club Club Deportivo Universidad Católica, finishing second behind Colo-Colo in Apertura 2007. On 3 August of that year, he replaced Julio César Uribe as manager of the national side; he went on to be part of the disastrous 2010 FIFA World Cup qualification campaign, as they only won three times and ranked last.

Honours

Player
San Agustín
Peruvian Primera División: 1986

Universitario
Peruvian Primera División: 1987, 1999, 2000
Apertura 2002

Universidad Católica
Copa Chile: 1991

Manager
Sporting Cristal
Peruvian Primera División: 2005

Managerial statistics

References

External links

1967 births
Living people
Footballers from Lima
Peruvian footballers
Association football midfielders
Peruvian Primera División players
Club Universitario de Deportes footballers
Chilean Primera División players
Club Deportivo Universidad Católica footballers
La Liga players
CD Tenerife players
UD Salamanca players
RC Celta de Vigo players
Valencia CF players
Belgian Pro League players
K.V. Mechelen players
Süper Lig players
Beşiktaş J.K. footballers
Peru international footballers
1987 Copa América players
1989 Copa América players
1991 Copa América players
1993 Copa América players
1995 Copa América players
2000 CONCACAF Gold Cup players
2001 Copa América players
Peruvian expatriate footballers
Expatriate footballers in Chile
Expatriate footballers in Spain
Expatriate footballers in Turkey
Expatriate footballers in Belgium
Peruvian expatriate sportspeople in Chile
Peruvian expatriate sportspeople in Spain
Peruvian football managers
Tercera División managers
Villarreal CF B managers
Argentine Primera División players
Doping cases in association football
Club Atlético Colón managers
Peruvian Primera División managers
Sporting Cristal managers
Club Universitario de Deportes managers
Universidad San Martín managers
Club Deportivo Universidad Católica managers
Peru national football team managers
Peruvian expatriate football managers
Expatriate football managers in Argentina
Expatriate football managers in Spain
Expatriate football managers in Chile
Peruvian expatriate sportspeople in Argentina
Club Deportivo Universidad César Vallejo managers